Aleksander Dominik Kazanowski (1605 – February 1648), was a noble (szlachcic), magnate, voivode of Bracław Voivodeship in the Polish–Lithuanian Commonwealth.

Before 6 November 1646 he became a voivode of Bracław.

He married Anna Potocka. They had two daughters: Helena and Maria Anna Kazanowska (1643–1687), wife of Stanisław Jan Jabłonowski.

References
 Polski Słownik Biograficzny, Vol. XII, Kraków-Wrocław, 1966-1967

1648 deaths
Aleksander Dominik
1605 births